In chemistry, isomerization or isomerisation is the process in which a molecule, polyatomic ion   or molecular fragment is transformed into an isomer with a different chemical structure. Enolization is an example of isomerization, as is tautomerization. When the isomerization occurs intramolecularly it may be called a rearrangement reaction.

When the activation energy for the isomerization reaction is sufficiently small, both isomers will exist in a temperature-dependent equilibrium with each other. Many values of the standard free energy difference, have been calculated, with good agreement between observed and calculated data.

Examples and applications

Alkanes
Skeletal isomerization occurs in the cracking process, used in the petrochemical industry. As well as reducing the average chain length, straight-chain hydrocarbons are converted to branched isomers in the process, as illustrated the following reaction of n-butane to i-butane.
\overset{n-butane}{CH3CH2CH2CH3} -> \overset{i-butane}{CH3CH(CH3)CH3}

Fuels containing branched hydrocarbons are favored for internal combustion engines for their higher octane rating.

Alkenes
Terminal alkenes isomerize to internal alkenes in the presence of metal catalysts. This process is employed in the Shell higher olefin process to convert alpha-olefins to internal olefins, which are subjected to olefin metathesis. In certain kinds of alkene polymerization reactions, chain walking is an isomerization process that introduces branches into growing polymers.

The trans isomer of resveratrol can be converted to the cis isomer in a photochemical reaction.

Thermal rearrangement of azulene to naphthalene has been observed.

Other examples
Aldose-ketose isomerism, aka Lobry de Bruyn–van Ekenstein transformation, provides an example in saccharide chemistry.

An example of an organometallic isomerization is the production of decaphenylferrocene,  from its linkage isomer.

See also
Base-promoted epoxide isomerization
Epimerization
Racemization
Tautomerization
Linkage isomerism

References

Chemical reactions